Cell is a 2006 apocalyptic horror novel by American author Stephen King. The story follows a New England artist struggling to reunite with his young son after a mysterious signal broadcast over the global cell phone network turns the majority of his fellow humans into mindless vicious animals.

Plot
Clayton Riddell, a struggling artist from Maine, has just landed a graphic novel deal in Boston when "The Pulse", a signal sent out over the global cell phone network, suddenly turns every cell phone user into mindless zombie-like killers. Clay is standing in Boston Common when the Pulse hits, causing chaos to erupt around him near an ice cream truck. Civilization crumbles as the "phoners" attack each other and anyone in view.

Amidst the chaos, Clay is thrown together with middle-aged Thomas McCourt and fifteen-year-old Alice Maxwell; the trio escapes to Tom's suburban home as Boston burns. The next day, they learn the "phoners" have begun foraging for food and banding together. Clay is still determined to return to Maine and reunite with his young son, Johnny. Having no better alternatives, Tom and Alice come with him. They trek north by night across a devastated New England, having fleeting encounters with other survivors and catching disturbing hints about the activities of the phoners, who still attack non-phoners on sight.

Crossing into New Hampshire, they arrive at the Gaiten Academy, a prep school with one remaining teacher, Headmaster Charles Ardai, and one surviving pupil, Jordan. The pair show the newcomers where the local phoner flock goes at night: they pack themselves into the Academy's soccer field and "switch off" until morning. It is clear the phoners have become a hive mind and are developing psychic abilities. The five survivors decide they must destroy the flock and, using two propane tankers, they succeed in doing so.

Clay tries to get everyone to flee the scene, but the others refuse to abandon the elderly Ardai. That night, all of the survivors share the same horrific dream: each dreamer sees himself in a stadium, surrounded by phoners, as a disheveled man wearing a Harvard hooded sweatshirt approaches. Waking, the heroes share their frightening dream experiences and dub him "the Raggedy Man". A new flock surrounds their residence, and the survivors face the phoners’ leader:  the Raggedy Man from their dreams. The phoners flock kills other normals in reprisal and orders the protagonists to head north to a spot in Maine called "Kashwak".  The flock psychically compels Ardai to commit suicide. Clay and the others bury him and travel north, as Clay is still determined to go home.

En route, they learn that as "flock-killers," they have been psychically marked as untouchables, to be shunned by other normies. Following a petty squabble on the road, Alice is killed by a loutish pair of normies. The group buries her and arrives in Clay's hometown of Kent Pond, where they discover notes which tell them Clay's estranged wife Sharon was turned into a phoner, but their son Johnny survived for several days, before he and the other normies were prompted by the phoners to head to the supposedly cell phone-free Kashwak. Clay has another nightmare which reveals that once there, the normie refugees were all exposed to the Pulse. He remains intent on finding his son, but after meeting another group of flock-killers, Tom and Jordan decide to avoid the ceremonial executions the phoners have planned. Before separating, the group discovers that Alice's murderers were psychically compelled into a gruesome suicide act for touching an untouchable.

Clay sets off alone, but the others soon reappear driving a small school bus; the phoners have used their ever-increasing psychic powers to force them to rejoin him. One of the flock-killers, construction worker Ray Huizenga, surreptitiously gives Clay a cell phone and a phone number, telling him to use them when the time is right; Ray then commits suicide. The group arrives at Kashwak, the site of a half-assembled county fair, where increasing numbers of phoners are beginning to behave erratically and break out of the flock. Jordan theorizes that a computer program caused the Pulse and that, while it is still broadcasting into the battery-powered cell phone network, it has become corrupted with a computer worm that has infected the newer phoners with a mutated Pulse. Nevertheless, an entire army of phoners is waiting for them and Clay notices Sharon is among them. The phoners lock the group in the fair's exhibition hall for the night; tomorrow is the ceremonial execution to be psychically broadcast to all phoners and remaining normies in the world.

As Clay awaits their morning execution, he sees Ray's unspoken plan: Ray had filled the rear of the bus with explosives, wired a phone-triggered detonator to them and killed himself to prevent the phoners from telepathically discovering the explosives. The group breaks a window for Jordan to squeeze through and he drives the vehicle into the midst of the inert phoners. Thanks to a jury-rigged cell phone patch set up by the pre-Pulse fair workers, Clay is able to detonate the bomb and wipe out the Raggedy Man and his flock.

The majority of the group heads into Canada, to let the approaching winter wipe out the region's unprotected and leaderless phoners. Clay heads south, seeking his son. He finds Johnny, who received a "corrupted" Pulse; he wandered away from Kashwak and seems to almost recognize his father. However, Johnny is an erratic shadow of his former self and so, following another theory of Jordan's, Clay decides to give Johnny another blast from the Pulse, hoping the increasingly corrupted signal will cancel itself out and reset his son's brain. The book ends with Clay dialing and placing the cell phone to Johnny's ear.

Characters
Clayton Riddell: a graphic artist separated from his family in Boston as the Pulse destroys civilization. Clay heads north with a group of survivors and tries to find his son, Johnny, and estranged wife, Sharon.
Thomas McCourt: a middle-aged man from Malden; Tom teams up with Clay in the initial chaos created by the Pulse. With Clay and Alice, he travels to his home in Malden. Then, they move on north where they meet others. He remains with the group until after Kashwak, when he survives and leaves Clay along with Jordan, Denise and Dan.
Alice Maxwell: a 15-year-old girl; Alice teams up with Clay and Tom to head north. She forces her anxiety and trauma into an abandoned child's Nike shoe which helps her cope with the atrocities committed by the phoners. Alice remains an important part of the group who continue to take inspiration from her even after her death.
Jordan: a 12-year-old-boy studying at Gaiten Academy, a prep school that was devastated by the Pulse; Jordan faithfully remains with the headmaster, Charles Ardai, until they destroy the flock at the school and Ardai is driven to suicide by the phoners. Jordan remains with Clay's group and provides the intellectual theory and comparison of the effects of the Pulse to that of a worm in a computer.
Charles Ardai: the headmaster of Jordan's prep school; Ardai is a father figure to Jordan and cares for the group. They manage to destroy a flock of phoners, but then Ardai is telepathically forced to commit suicide.
Dan Hartwick: a survivor and head of another flock-killing group; a former professor, Dan is intelligent and joins Clay's group as they head to Kashwak. He ultimately survives and leaves Clay with Jordan, Denise and Tom.
Denise Link: a pregnant survivor and part of Dan's flock-killing group; Denise joins the group with Dan and Ray and ultimately survives with them. She is described by Clay as a strong-willed woman and leaves with Tom, Jordan and Dan after Kashwak.
Ray Huizenga: a construction worker who specialized in explosives; Ray was part of Dan's group of flock-killers along with Denise, but has a plan regarding Kashwak. He gives Clay vague instructions about the plan before committing suicide with a pistol in order to mask his plans from the phoners. This ultimately saves the entire group.
The Raggedy Man/President of Harvard: the main antagonist of the book; he wears a torn red Harvard hoodie. He is killed by the bomb at Kashwak.
"Pixie Light": a teenage girl spotted by Clay in Boston and dubbed Pixie Light because of her haircut and hair color, this girl was one of the first victims of the Pulse and attacked another phoner seconds after listening to the Pulse on her cell phone. Pixie Light tore out the phoner's neck with her teeth and was knocked unconscious by Clay before she could do any more harm and was left on the streets of Boston.
"Pixie Dark": a teenage girl spotted by Clay in Boston who was named for reasons similar to Pixie Light; Pixie Dark was Pixie Light's friend and only heard a small dose of the Pulse via Pixie Light's cell phone. Instead of going completely crazy like her friend, Pixie Dark's brain was erased by the Pulse and she lost her mind, running off into Boston shouting "Who am I?" over and over. She is referenced several times throughout the book by Clay.
Gunner and Harold: a pair of young men encountered by Clay's group not long after they depart Gaiten; mouthy and rude (particularly toward Alice), they believe that Kashwak will be a safe haven for "normies". Following their brutal reciprocation to a threat made to them by Clay, Gunner and Harold are summarily punished for daring to touch an untouchable.
Other minor characters are briefly mentioned or seen throughout the book, primarily either as "normies" ("Plump Bible-toting Lady", Roscoe Handt) or phoners ("Power Suit Woman", Judy Scottoni).

eBay auction
A role in the story was offered to the winner of a charity auction for the First Amendment Project, sponsored by eBay:

Other authors like Peter Straub also participated in the online auction, selling roles in their upcoming books. The King auction ran between September 8 and 18, 2005 and the winner, a Ft. Lauderdale woman named Pam Alexander, paid $25,100 (equivalent to $ in ). Ms. Alexander gave the honor as a gift to her brother Ray Huizenga; his name was given to one of the zombie-slaughtering "flock-killers" in the story, a construction worker who specializes in explosives, but then later commits suicide in order to aid the "flock-killers" escape.

Reception
The book generally received positive reviews from critics. Publishers Weekly described it as "a glib, technophobic but compelling look at the end of civilization" and full of "jaunty and witty" sociological observations. Stephen King scholar Bev Vincent said "It's a dark, gritty, pessimistic novel in many ways and stands in stark contrast to the fundamental optimism of The Stand".

Film adaptation

On March 8, 2006, website Ain't It Cool News announced that Dimension Films had bought the film rights to the book and would produce a film to be directed by Eli Roth (Hostel, Cabin Fever) for a 2009 release.

Said Roth about his approach to the film:
{{quote|text=I love that book. Such a smart take on the zombie movie. I am so psyched to do it. I think you can really do almost a cross between the Dawn of the Dead remake with a 'Roland Emmerich' approach (for lack of a better reference) where you show it happening all over the world. When the pulse hits, I wanna see it hit EVERYWHERE. In restaurants, in movie theaters, at sports events, all the places that people drive you crazy when they're talking on their cell phones. I see total armageddon. People going crazy killing each other – everyone at once – all over the world. Cars smashing into each other, people getting stabbed, throats getting ripped out. The one thing I always wanted to see in zombie movies is the actual moment the plague hits, and not just in one spot, but everywhere. You usually get flashes of it happening around the world on news broadcasts, but you never actually get to experience it happening everywhere. Then as the phone crazies start to change and mutate, the story gets pared down to a story about human survival in the post-apocalyptic world ruled by phone crazies. I'm so excited, I wish the script was ready right now so I could start production. But it'll get written (or at least a draft will) while I'm doing Hostel 2, and then I can go right into it. It should feel like an ultra-violent event movie. }}

On June 15, 2007, Eli Roth posted in his MySpace blog that he would not be directing Cell "anytime soon", as he planned to spend the rest of the year writing other projects. On July 10, 2009, he dropped out of the project, saying:

On November 11, 2009, Stephen King announced at a book signing in Dundalk, Maryland that he had finished a screenplay. He stated that he had complaints with the ending of the book and it was redone for the screenplay.

On October 31, 2012, it was announced that actor John Cusack would play the lead role of Clayton Riddell. On November 5, 2013, it was reported that Samuel L. Jackson had signed on to play Tom McCourt. Both actors  previously starred in 1408'', a 2007 film adaption of Stephen King’s short story of the same name.

The film was released on June 10, 2016 to video on demand, prior to a limited release scheduled for July 8, 2016.

References

External links

2006 American novels
Novels by Stephen King
Novels set in Boston
Novels set in Maine
Novels set in New Hampshire
American zombie novels
American novels adapted into films
Science fiction horror novels
Apocalyptic novels
Works about mobile phones
American novels adapted into television shows